U.S. Città di Palermo played the 2010–11 season in Serie A, the seventh consecutive season for the Sicilian club in the Italian top flight since their return to the league in 2004.

Review and events

Long-time Palermo players Fábio Simplício and Mark Bresciano left the rosanero by 30 June after failing to agree for a contract extension with the club. On 29 May 2010 Legea was announced as Palermo's new teamwear sponsor, taking over such duties from Lotto Sport Italia. The club also announced in June 2010 a one-year agreement extension with main sponsor Eurobet.

The first high-profile move from Palermo was completed on 11 June, when the club announced the signing of Chilean prolific striker Mauricio Pinilla from Grosseto. The move was followed by the signing of experienced Siena forward Massimo Maccarone days later.

On 6 July it was confirmed the appointment of 38-year-old former player Giovanni Tedesco as the club's new team manager. On 7 July Palermo also announced the signing of Polish international defender Kamil Glik.

On 8 July, Palermo announced to have sold Danish international centre-back Simon Kjær to 1. Bundesliga club VfL Wolfsburg. Four days later, the club confirmed to have signed Italy U-20 international Matteo Darmian from AC Milan in a co-ownership bid.

On 16 July Palermo announced the signing of Argentine full-back
Santiago García from Rosario Central. The next day Napoli announced the acquisition of Uruguayan international striker Edinson Cavani from the rosanero club.

As a replacement for Kjær, Palermo then chose to acquire young Argentine centre back Ezequiel Muñoz; the player was successively announced to have joined the club's Austrian training camp on 30 July, after he underwent a medical in Sicily. The transfer was officially formalized on 4 August. On 6 August, Paolo Beruatto was introduced as the new head of the Primavera under-19 squad. On the same day, Palermo was coupled to Slovenian club NK Maribor for the playoff round of the 2010–11 UEFA Europa League, with the first leg scheduled at Stadio Renzo Barbera, Palermo on 19 August, and the return leg seven days later at Maribor's home venue. In the first leg, and the first competitive seasonal game for Palermo, the Sicilians defeated Maribor with a clear result of 3–0, thanks to goals from Maccarone, Hernández and Pastore; the rosanero won the qualification to the group stage one week late, despite losing the return leg 3–2. On the following group stage draw, Palermo was included in Group F together with PFC CSKA Moscow, Sparta Prague and FC Lausanne-Sport.

On 27 August 2010 Maribor announced to have sold midfielders Armin Bačinović and Josip Iličić, both Slovenian internationals, to Palermo. The first league game, played on 29 August, ended in a 0–0 home draw to Cagliari; on the very next day, Palermo announced the signing of Brazilian 18-year-old attacking midfielder João Pedro from Atlético Mineiro.

Palermo started the season in good fashion, achieving impressive results such as away wins against Juventus and Fiorentina, as well a clear home win against Roma; in particular, the newly acquired Slovenian duo of Bačinović and Ilicić proved to be an absolute bargain signing, with both players being regularly featured in Palermo's Serie A games and praised. Other new signings who managed to break into the first team in a regular basis included defender Ezequiel Muñoz and striker Mauricio Pinilla.

Impressive results at domestic league level were not repeated in the Europa League, as Palermo was eliminated by the likes of PFC CSKA Moscow and Sparta Prague, ending the qualification round with only 7 points (2 wins, 1 draw, 3 losses).

In December 2010 Palermo confirmed to have signed a third Slovenian player from Maribor, defender Siniša Anđelković, who will join the rosanero from January 2011. A fourth Slovenian player, midfielder Jasmin Kurtić, was acquired days later.

Another winter move was completed on 24 January 2011, with striker Massimo Maccarone departing from Sicily after only six months, in order to join fellow Serie A club Sampdoria in a permanent transfer move. The following day, Palermo won qualification to the Coppa Italia semifinals after defeating Parma on penalties.

This result was followed by a string of three consecutive defeats, the latest of whom being a record home loss in which a nine-man Palermo succumbed to Udinese in a shocking 0–7 result, which represents both the largest home loss and the largest Serie A loss in the club's history. Such result led to immediate rumours regarding an imminent dismissal of head coach Delio Rossi, that was informally confirmed by Zamparini himself in several interview throughout the day. The next day Palermo formally announced the dismissal of Delio Rossi and the appointment Serse Cosmi as his replacement. After two more losses (against Lazio and Genoa, respectively), Cosmi achieved his first win in charge of Palermo by surprisingly defeating league-toppers AC Milan in a 1–0 home triumph, with Romanian defender Dorin Goian scoring the only goal of the game.

On 3 April 2011 Cosmi, after the defeat in the derby with Catania, for 4–0 was sacked. In its place, after 4 games back Delio Rossi. Rossi's return led Palermo ultimately back to track with a surprising 3–2 win at Stadio Olimpico against Roma, and an even more surprising win in the Coppa Italia semifinals, where the rosanero defeated freshly-crowned Italian champions AC Milan with an aggregate 4–3 win (2–2 in Milan, 2–1 in Palermo), thus qualifying the Sicilians to the domestic cup final for their third time in history. The final, that saw a massive participation from Palermo fans, ended however in a rather controversial 1–3 loss to Inter, with Muñoz scoring the only goal for the rosanero in a game the Sicilians were forced to play without key elements as Bačinović and Bovo, and with Goian getting injured in the first half to be replaced by Moris Carrozzieri, who was at his second game in the season after a two-year suspension due to cocaine usage. In the days following the event, Zamparini and Delio Rossi announced to have parted company, thus freeing the Palermo dugout for the new season.

Confirmed summer transfer market bids
In

Out

Out on loan

Confirmed winter transfer market bids
In

Out

Out on loan

Squad stats
Updated 22 May 2011

|-
|colspan="14"|Players sold or loaned out during the winter transfer market:

|}

Match results

Legend

Serie A

Coppa Italia

UEFA Europa League

References

2010-11
Italian football clubs 2010–11 season